The 1969 Speedway World Pairs Championship was the unofficial World Best Pairs Championship FIM. The final took place in Stockholm, Sweden. The championship was won by New Zealand (28 points) who beat Sweden (27 points) and England (21 points). Although unofficial at the time it is now regarded as being a major event and is listed in all speedway lists.

Western Zone Semifinal
  London
 August 14

European Semifinal
  Meissen
 August 31

Final
  Stockholm, Gubbängens IP
 September 25

See also
 1969 Individual Speedway World Championship
 1969 Speedway World Team Cup
 motorcycle speedway
 1969 in sports

References

1968
World Pairs